Peradeniya Junction is a railway station on the Main railway line of Sri Lanka, situated between Kathaluwa and Koshinna railway stations. It is an important railway junction in Sri Lanka Railways' network, connecting the Main Line, which runs from Colombo to Badulla and the Matale Line, which runs from Peradeniya to Matale via Kandy.

History

Peradeniya railway station is one of the oldest railway stations in Sri Lanka, opening in 1867 when the rail line was extended from Ambepussa to Kandy, as a part of the first train route which connected Colombo to Kandy. Initially the station was not a railway junction station. On 15 January 1873 it became a junction station, with the construction of a rail line from Peradeniya to Gampola, resulting in the station being renamed the Peradeniya Junction Railway Station. 

The station initially had two platforms and type of the railway junction was Y-shaped track arrangement, which meant that train routing from one line to the other line required the train to reverse. Sri Lanka Railways subsequently upgraded the junction railway network to its current Triangular track configuration, as well as constructing an additional platform separate from the main station. The result being that trains can be routed from any line to any other line, without reversing the train. The new third platform opened on 1 December 2008. Generally, Platform One and Two serve the trains of Matale line and Main line. Platform Three is used for inbound and outbound services to the Main line. The majority of all long distance and local trains stop at the station.

Timetable

Continuity

References

Railway stations in Kandy District
Railway stations on the Matale Line
Railway stations on the Main Line (Sri Lanka)
Railway stations opened in 1867
Rail transport in Central Province, Sri Lanka